Triple Portrait of Arrigo, Pietro and Amon is a 1598-1600 painting by Agostino Carracci, produced in Rome whilst he was assisting his brother Annibale Carracci with the frescoes in the Palazzo Farnese for Odoardo Farnese. It is now in the National Museum of Capodimonte in Naples.

Previously misidentified as an allegorical or mythological artwork, Roberto Zapperi has identified it instead as a group portrait. To the right is the hairy-faced Arrigo, a sufferer from hypertrichosis, with the head of 'Pietro Matto' or 'Mad Peter' in the top right hand corner. To the left is the dwarf Amon, with a parrot on his shoulder and a dog under his right arm.

References

1600 paintings
16th-century portraits
Group portraits by Italian artists
Paintings in the collection of the Museo di Capodimonte
Works about dwarfism
Paintings by Agostino Carracci